Allegro Common Lisp is a programming language with an integrated development environment (IDE), developed by Franz Inc. It is a dialect of the language Lisp, a commercial software implementation of the language Common Lisp. Allegro CL provides the full American National Standards Institute (ANSI) Common Lisp standard with many extensions, including threads, CLOS streams, CLOS MOP, Unicode, SSL streams, implementations of various Internet protocols, OpenGL interface. The first version of Allegro Common Lisp was finished at the end of 1986, originally called Extended Common Lisp. Allegro CL is available for many operating systems including Microsoft Windows (32/64-bit), and many Unix and Unix-like, 32-bit or 64-bit, including macOS (Intel, 32/64-bit), Linux (32/64-bit), FreeBSD (32-bit), Solaris (x64, SPARC; 32/64-bit), UNICOS, and UTS. Internationalization and localization support is based on Unicode. It supports various external text encodings and provides string and character types based on Universal Coded Character Set 2 (UCS-2). Allegro CL can be used with and without its integrated development environment (IDE), which is available for Windows, Linux, and on macOS in version 8.2. The IDE (written in Allegro CL) includes development tools including an editor and an interface designer. Allegro CL can be used to deliver applications.

Allegro CL is available as freeware, a Free Express Edition (with some limits like a constrained heap space) for non-commercial use. Customers can get access to much of the source code of Allegro CL.

Allegro CL includes an implementation of Prolog and an object caching database called AllegroCache.
 
The most recent release, Allegro CL 10.1, supports Symmetric Multiprocessing.

Allegro CL has been used to implement various applications:

 Naughty Dog used it for the development of various video games, implementing the development environments for Game Oriented Object Lisp and Game Oriented Assembly Lisp
 Allegro CL has been used to implement scheduling systems for various telescopes including the Hubble Space Telescope and the Spitzer Space Telescope

See also
LispWorks

References

External links
 

Common Lisp implementations
Common Lisp (programming language) software
Functional languages
Object-oriented programming languages